Sumer Singh Solanki (born 1 May 1972) is an Indian politician and a member of the Rajya Sabha from Madhya Pradesh. He is a member of the Bharatiya Janata Party. Before entering politics he was an assistant professor of history in Barwani, Madhya Pradesh. In 2020 Solanki's name in the list of Rajya Sabha candidates surprised many and it was later known that he was chosen on the recommendations of the RSS.

Solanki has been working for the upliftment of tribal people through Vanwasi Kalyan Parishad for long time.

References

Rajya Sabha members from Madhya Pradesh
Bharatiya Janata Party politicians from Madhya Pradesh
1972 births
Living people